Arthur Frederick Hobart Mills is one of a family of authors.  His grandfather, Arthur Mills, was a Tory and an expert of colonial economies and governance.  The senior Mills' India in 1858 describes the political and economic conditions in India after the Indian Rebellion of 1857.  Arthur F. H. Mills is the brother of children's book author George Mills (Meredith and Co., King Willow) and author, explorer, and adventurer Lady Dorothy Mills (The Laughter of Fools, The Road to Timbuktu), to whom he was married from 1916 through their divorce in 1933.

Education and career 
Captain Mills (Wellington College, Berkshire, Royal Military Academy Sandhurst) was wounded in World War I at La Bassée and wrote a pair of books, his first, about that experience: With My Regiment: From the Aisne to La Bassée (J. B. Lippincott & Co.: Philadelphia, 1916) and Hospital Days (T. Fisher Unwin: London, 1916) under the pseudonym Platoon Commander.  At his wedding to Lady Dorthy Walpole in 1916, her wedding ring was made from a bullet that had been surgically removed from his ankle.

Despite favorable reviews, frequent impressions, and global translations of many of his earlier books (The Broadway Madonna, The Gold Cat), Mills eventually became known as a genre author of cheap crime and adventure novels.  His work has been largely forgotten.

Mills died in Hampshire, United Kingdom, on 18 February 1955.

Bibliography

References

External links 
Who Is George Mills?
Google Books: With My Regiment

1887 births
1955 deaths
People from Stratton, Cornwall
English male novelists
20th-century English novelists
20th-century English male writers